William Lynn Parkinson (September 18, 1902 – October 26, 1959) was a United States circuit judge of the United States Court of Appeals for the Seventh Circuit and previously was a United States district judge of the United States District Court for the Northern District of Indiana.

Education and career

Born in Attica, Indiana, Parkinson read law to enter the bar in 1923. He was in private practice in Lafayette, Indiana, from 1923 to 1937. He was a Judge of the Indiana Circuit Court for the Twenty-Third Judicial Circuit from 1937 to 1954.

Federal judicial service

Parkinson was nominated by President Dwight D. Eisenhower on August 2, 1954, to the United States District Court for the Northern District of Indiana, to a new seat authorized by 68 Stat. 8. He was confirmed by the United States Senate on August 6, 1954, and received his commission on August 6, 1954. His service terminated on September 9, 1957, due to his elevation to the Seventh Circuit.

Parkinson was nominated by President Eisenhower on August 21, 1957, to a seat on the United States Court of Appeals for the Seventh Circuit vacated by Judge Hardress Nathan Swaim. He was confirmed by the Senate on August 22, 1957, and received his commission on August 26, 1957. His service terminated on October 26, 1959, due to his death.

Death

Parkinson disappeared on October 26, 1959, under mysterious circumstances while returning to his apartment from his Chicago, Illinois, judicial office. Witnesses who saw him shortly before his disappearance indicated that he appeared to be ill. He disappeared in the immediate area of Lake Michigan. His hat, sunglasses and umbrella were later found on the lake shore. His body was found six months later on April 24, 1960, in the water one half mile from where he disappeared and was positively identified. The cause of death was determined to be drowning. An inquest on May 2, 1960, indicated his death was under mysterious circumstances and did not rule out either natural death or foul play.

References

Sources
 

1902 births
1959 deaths
Indiana state court judges
Judges of the United States District Court for the Northern District of Indiana
United States district court judges appointed by Dwight D. Eisenhower
Judges of the United States Court of Appeals for the Seventh Circuit
United States court of appeals judges appointed by Dwight D. Eisenhower
20th-century American judges
People from Attica, Indiana
United States federal judges admitted to the practice of law by reading law